The 2017 Formula Masters Series season was the seventh season of the Formula Pilota China series, and the first under the Formula Masters Series branding. The championship began on 8 April at the Sepang International Circuit in Malaysia and finished on 24 September at the Shanghai International Circuit in China, after eighteen races held at five meetings.

Teams and drivers

Race calendar and results
The definitive race calendar was confirmed on 6 April 2017. As per the regulations, each round will have two to three 25-minute races and one shorter 15-minute race, with a different set of points awarded for each format. Races denoted with a blue background are 15-minute races.

Championship standings

Scoring system

Points for are awarded as follows:

Drivers' championship

References

External links
 

Formula Masters China seasons
Formula Masters China
Formula Masters China
Masters China